Yarra Park  (35.469 hectares) is part of the Melbourne Sports and Entertainment Precinct, the premier sporting precinct of Victoria, Australia. Located in Yarra Park is the Melbourne Cricket Ground (MCG) and numerous sporting fields and ovals, including the associated sporting complexes of Melbourne and Olympic Parks. The park and sporting facilities are located in the inner-suburb of East Melbourne. In the late 1850s, many of the earliest games of Australian rules football were played at Yarra Park, which was known at the time as the Richmond Paddock.

Tree-lined paths run parallel to Punt Road and Swan Street, and criss-cross the park. Some of the lawns are used for parking for sporting events. Three footbridges allow pedestrians and cyclists to cross the railway lines to the different sporting venues and easy access to the Yarra River Trail.

Around the MCG are sculptures of Australian sporting heroes including: Australian rules footballers Ron Barassi and Dick Reynolds; cricketers Donald Bradman and Keith Miller; and athlete Betty Cuthbert. Nearby is an old eucalyptus scar tree which shows a big scar caused by harvesting of bark for a canoe by the original inhabitants of the Yarra River Valley, the Wurundjeri people of the Kulin nation.

The adjacent Punt Road Oval, home of the Richmond Football Club features a statue of Tiger legend Jack Dyer.

History

In 1856, Victorian Governor Charles La Trobe proclaimed 81 hectares of parkland, extending from Punt Road to Swanston Street, and from Wellington Parade to the Yarra River. Initially the area was also used as police paddocks for the agistment of police horses.

The earliest recorded matches of Australian rules football were played at the Richmond Paddock in 1858. The Argus wrote the following year: "Football, like cricket, has become an institution ... expect to see every available portion of Richmond Paddock, and other 'lungs of the city', dotted by animated groups in full pursuit of the leathern spheroid." It remained an important site for the sport until the MCG and other cricket grounds were opened for football in the late 1870s.

By the 1860s five recreational ovals were marked out: the Melbourne Cricket Ground, Richmond Cricket Ground, East Melbourne Cricket Club ovals (two), and an oval in Gosch's Paddock, south of Swan Street. In the southern section of the park land was set aside for the Friendly Society's Gardens (now Olympic Park), and the Scotch College oval. In 1874 Yarra Park Primary School was opened in the north east corner of the park. A housing subdivision was excised from the park in 1881.

Since this time major excisions have been made for Melbourne's eastern and southeastern rail lines, the Hurstbridge railway line, Olympic Park Sporting Complex, Rod Laver Arena in Melbourne Park's National Tennis Centre. However, Gosch's Paddock still links Yarra Park to the Yarra River at the Morrell Bridge for cyclists and pedestrians.

In 2007, The Government Introduced the 'Melbourne Cricket Ground and Yarra Park Amendment Bill'.
Sports Minister James Merlino told Parliament ‘The main focus of the bill, is to transfer responsibility for Yarra Park from the City of Melbourne to the Melbourne Cricket Ground Trust.’

The site is listed on the Victorian Heritage Register.

Since 2013, The Melbourne Football Club in the Australian Football League (AFL) uses the park as their outdoor training ground. In August 2021, The Melbourne Football Club announced that The oval will be upgraded and redeveloped in the 2021/22 off-season to increase the dimensions to better match the measurements of the MCG and Docklands Stadium. Redevelopment of Goschs Paddock oval commenced on 5 December 2021.

References

External links
Melbourne City Council - Yarra Park
Map
Yarra Park Adventure Tour
Yarra Park Association

Parks in Melbourne
Heritage sites in Melbourne
East Melbourne, Victoria